The 2019–20 OK Liga was the 51st season of the top-tier league of rink hockey in Spain. As the season was unfinished, Barcelona were declared champions.

Format changes
The competition recovered the playoffs for the title and for relegation. The first ten qualified teams would fight for the title after the regular season, while the four last teams would try to avoid relegation. Two teams would be relegated to OK Liga Plata.

However, the season was suspended due to the COVID-19 pandemic after remaining one round for ending the regular season.

Teams

Regular season

League table

Results

Copa del Rey

The 2020 Copa del Rey was the 78th edition of the Spanish men's roller hockey cup. The draw was held in A Coruña on 30 January 2020.

It was suspended due to the COVID-19 pandemic.

Bracket

Source: FEP

Supercopa de España

The 2019 Supercopa de España was the 16th edition of the Spanish men's roller hockey supercup, played on 14 and 15 September 2019.

Liceo were the defending champions.

Source

Lower divisions

OK Liga Plata
The OK Liga Plata will be played by 24 teams.

Group North

Group South

Promotion playoffs

OK Liga Bronce
The two non-Catalan groups were composed by:
Group North: 3 teams from Galicia, 3 teams from Asturias and 2 teams from the Northern league
Group South: 4 teams from Madrid and 4 teams from the Southern league.

Catalan playoffs

See also
2019–20 OK Liga Femenina

References

External links
Real Federación Española de Patinaje

OK Liga seasons
2019 in roller hockey
2020 in roller hockey
2019 in Spanish sport
2020 in Spanish sport
OK Liga, 2019-20